Malutinisuchus is an extinct genus of Archosauromorph. The genus was named in 1986 with the description of the type species M. gratus. Malutinisuchus is known from Ladinian-age Middle Triassic deposits in the Bukobay and Rassypnaya localities in Orenburg Oblast, Russia. In Russia, deposits of this age are referred to the Bukobay Gorizont.

References

Prehistoric archosauromorphs
Prehistoric reptile genera
Ladinian genera
Middle Triassic reptiles of Europe
Triassic Russia
Fossils of Russia
Fossil taxa described in 1986